Joaquín Ferreira (born April 28, 1986) is an Argentine actor, model and former pornographic actor, best known for his role as Potro Romani in the Netflix comedy-drama series, Club de Cuervos.

Life and career
Ferreira was born and raised in Buenos Aires, Argentina. He attended University of Buenos Aires and University of Palermo where he finished his career in graphic design. In Argentina, Ferreira performed in porn under name David Dynamo. He later moved to Mexico and in 2015 landed a role on Netflix's first Spanish-language original series Club de Cuervos. In 2016, he made his theater debut in comedy 23 centimetros, appearing on stage fully naked with erected penis. In 2018, he starred in the Club de Cuervos spinoff, Yo, Potro.

Ferreira starred in Mexican telenovelas Paquita la del Barrio (2017), Tres Milagros (2018) and Doña Flor y sus dos maridos (2019).

Filmography

References

External links 
 

1986 births
Living people
21st-century Mexican male actors
Mexican male telenovela actors
Mexican male television actors
Male actors from Buenos Aires
University of Buenos Aires alumni
University of Palermo (Buenos Aires) alumni